The Broadgate Tower is a skyscraper in London's main financial district, the City of London. It was constructed between 2005 and 2008.

History
The developer for the site was British Land. In February 2005 Broadgate Plaza Ltd, a subsidiary of British Land, submitted a planning application to the City of London for the construction of two buildings of 33 stories and 13 stories. Broadgate Tower, which was designed by Skidmore, Owings & Merrill and built by Bovis Lend Lease, was completed in 2008. It was constructed at the same time as the neighbouring building, 201 Bishopsgate, and the two are separated by a covered pedestrian area.

The building was used in the James Bond Skyfall movie to represent a Shanghai skyscraper.

Occupants 
Current occupants include:

 Coyle Personnel
 SOM
 Reed Smith
 Liquidnet
 Your World
 Itau Bank
 Hill Dickinson
 Itochu
 Regus
 William Blair
 Trading Hub
 Dickson Minto
 Tradetech Alpha
 Equiniti
 Gill Jennings & Every
 Ricoh

Construction gallery

See also
 City of London Landmarks
 Heron Tower
 Tower 42
 30 St Mary Axe
 List of tallest buildings and structures in London

References

External links
 Official website
 201 Bishopsgate and the Broadgate Tower on SOM.com
 http://www.201bishopsgateandthebroadgatetower.com - Promotional website.
 Webcam

Skyscrapers in the City of London
Office buildings completed in 2009
Skidmore, Owings & Merrill buildings
Skyscraper office buildings in London